William P. MacKinnon, an American independent historian. A management consultant, MacKinnon is a historian of the American West, Mormon history, and Utah history who was described by Richard E. Turley in 2018 as "the acknowledged expert" and by Thomas G. Alexander in 2019 as "the most knowledgable authority" on what was known in its time as the American War of the Mormons' Succession (or more recently "the Utah War"), a topic of which MacKinnon began his study as a Yale sophomore history major in 1958. In 2018, MacKinnon presented the 35th Juanita Brooks Lecture at Dixie State University: "Across the Desert in 1858: Thomas L. Kane’s Mediating Mission and the Mormon Women who Made it Possible." , MacKinnon lived in Santa Barbara with his wife, Patricia.

Publications 
MacKinnon has published over thirty journal articles on the history of the American West. In 2010, he contributed an article to Mormonism: A Historical Encyclopedia.
 (2009) "Full of Courage: Thomas L. Kane, the Utah War, and BYU's Kane Collection as Lodestone', BYU Studies Quarterly: Vol. 48 : Iss. 4, Article 6.

References

External links 
 "Author takes on 'Utah War'" – Lee Davidson, Deseret News
 

American military historians
American male non-fiction writers
Historians of the Latter Day Saint movement
Historians of Utah
Living people
1939 births
Yale University alumni
Harvard Business School alumni